Laeliinae is a Neotropical subtribe including 40  orchid genera, such as Brassavola, Laelia and Cattleya. The genus Epidendrum is the largest within this subtribe, containing about 1500 species. This is followed by the genus Encyclia, with over 120 species.

List of genera 
Genera and number of species:

Acrorchis Dressler, 1
Adamantinia Van den Berg & M.W.Chase, 1
Alamania La Llave & Lex., 1
Arpophyllum La Llave & Lex, 5
Artorima Dressler & G.E.Pollard, 1
Barkeria Knowles & Westc., 17
Syn. Dothilophis Raf.
Brassavola R.Br., 17
Broughtonia R.Br., 6
Syn. Cattleyopsis Lem., Laeliopsis Lindl.
Cattleya Lindl., 118
Syn. Maelenia Dum., Sophronitis Lindl., Sophronia Lindl., Lophoglottis Raf., Hoffmannseggella H.G.Jones, Hadrolaelia (Schltr.) Chiron & V.P.Castro,  Dungsia Chiron & V.P.Castro, Microlaelia (Schltr.) Chiron & V.P.Castro, Chironiella Braem, Brasilaelia Campacci, Cattleyella Van den Berg & M.W.Chase, Schluckebieria Braem
Caularthron Raf., 3
Syn. Diacrium (Lindl.)Benth., Dothilophis Raf.
Constantia Barb.Rodr., 5
Dimerandra Schltr., 1
Dinema Lindl., 1
Domingoa Schltr., 5
Syn. Hartwegia Lindl., Nageliella L.O.Williams
Encyclia Hook., 120
Epidendrum L., 1500
Syn. Amblostoma Scheidw., Amblystoma Kuntze, Amphiglottis Salisb., Amphiglottium (Salisb.) Lindl. ex Stein, Auliza Salisb., Auliza Salisb. ex Small, Aulizeum Lindl. ex Stein, Coilostylis Raf., Didothion Raf., Diothonea Lindl., Epidanthus L.O.Williams, Epidendropsis Garay & Dunst., Gastropodium Lindl., Hemiscleria Lindl., Kalopternix Garay & Dunst., Lanium (Lindl.) Benth., Larnandra Raf., Minicolumna Brieger, Nanodes Lindl., Neohlemannia Kraenzl., Neowilliamsia Garay, Nyctosma Raf., Oerstedella Rchb.f., Physinga Lindl., Pleuranthium (Rchb.f.) Benth., Pseudepidendrum Rchb.f., Psilanthemum Klotszch ex Stein, Seraphyta Fisch. & C.A.Mey., Spathiger Small, Spathium Lindl. ex Stein, Stenoglossum Kunth, Tritelandra Raf.
Guarianthe Dressler & W.E.Higgins, 4
Hagsatera R.González, 2
Homalopetalum Rolfe, 7
Syn. Pinelia Lindl., Pinelianthe Rauschert
Isabelia Barb.Rodr., 3
Syn. Neolauchea Kraenzl., Sophronitella Schltr.
Jacquiniella Schltr., 11
Syn. Dressleriella Brieger, Briegeria Senghas
Laelia Lindl., 25
Syn. Amalia Lindl., Amalias Hofmsgg., Schomburgkia Lindl.
Leptotes Lindl., 5
Loefgrenianthus Hoehne, 1
Meiracyllium Rchb.f., 2
Microepidendrum Brieger ex W.E.Higgins, 1
Myrmecophila Rolfe, 10
Nidema Britton & Millsp., 2
Oestlundia W.E.Higgins, 4
Orleanesia Barb.Rodr., 11
Prosthechea Knowles & Westc., 100
Syn. Epithecium Knowles & Westc., Hormidium Heynh., Anacheilium Hoffmgg., Euchile (Dressler & G.E.Pollard) Withner, Pseudencyclia Chiron & V.P.Castro., Panarica Withner & P.A.Harding, Pollardia Withner & P.A.Harding
Pseudolaelia Porto & Brade, 10
Syn. Renata Ruschi
Psychilis Raf., 15
Pygmaeorchis Brade, 2
Quisqueya Dod, 4
Rhyncholaelia Schltr, 2
Scaphyglottis Poepp. & Endl., 60
Syn. Hexisea Lindl., Cladobium Lindl., Hexadesmia Brongn., Tetragamestus Rchb.f., Reichenbachanthus Barb.Rodr., Fractiungis Schltr., Leaoa Schltr. & Porto, Pachystele Schltr., Costaricaea Schltr., Ramonia Schltr., Platyglottis L.O.Williams
Tetramicra Lindl., 13

Nothogenera 
× Brassocattleya
× Brassoepidendrum
× Brassolaeliocattleya
× Cattleytonia
× Cattlianthe
× Epicattleya
× Epilaeliocattleya
× Hawkinsara
× Laeliocatarthron
× Laeliocatonia
× Laeliocattleya
× Otaara
× Potinara
× Rhyncholaeliocattleya
× Schombocattleya
× Sophrocattleya
× Sophrolaelia
× Sophrolaeliocattleya

References 
 van den Berg, C., W. E. Higgins, R. L. Dressler, W. M. Whitten, M. A. Soto Arenas, A. Culham and M. W. Chase. 2000. A Phylogenetic Analysis of Laeliinae (Orchidaceae) Based on Sequence Data from Internal Transcribed Spacers (ITS) of Nuclear Ribosomal DNA.  Lindleyana 15(2): 96–114.
 van den Berg, C. et al. 2005. Subtribe Laeliinae. pp. 181–316 In Pridgeon, A.M., Cribb, P.J., Chase, M.W., Rasmussen, F.N. Genera Orchidacearum Vol. IV. Oxford University Press, Oxford.
van den Berg C, Chase M.W. 2005 Nomenclatural notes on Laeliinae (Orchidaceae) - IV. New combinations in Laelia and Sophronitis. Kew Bull. 59. (4): 565-567 (2004 publ. 2005)
van den Berg, C. 2014. Reaching a compromise between conflicting nuclear and plastid phylogenetic trees: a new classification for the genus Cattleya (Epidendreae; Epidendroideae; Orchidaceae). Phytotaxa 186 (2): 075–086.

 
Orchid subtribes